Markt Piesting is a municipality in the district of Wiener Neustadt-Land in the Austrian state of Lower Austria.

Population

See also 
 Burgruine Starhemberg

References

Cities and towns in Wiener Neustadt-Land District
Starhemberg family